Suzuki Motor Gujarat Private Limited (SMGPL) is an automotive manufacturing plant owned by Suzuki Motor Corporation. Located in Hansalpur Becharaji village of Mandal Taluka in Ahmedabad District, it is the first and the only Suzuki automobile manufacturing plant in India that is wholly owned directly by Suzuki as a foreign company, as the other plants are owned by Maruti Suzuki. The plant supplies vehicles to Maruti Suzuki in the domestic market and to overseas markets. The plant was opened on 1 February 2017 and has the total annual capacity of 750,000 units.  The plant has helped Suzuki achieve exports of 2 million units from India.

Suzuki Motor Gujarat currently consists of four plants, the Plant A, opened in February 2017, has a total annual capacity of 250,000 and is currently assembling the Baleno. The Plant B was operational in January 2019 has a total vehicle producing capacity of 250,000 and it is currently assembling the Swift. Plant C started production in April 2021 with an annual capacity of 250,000 and is currently assembling the Dzire. The powertrain plant has an annual capacity of producing 500,000 engines and 500,000 powertrains.

The plant crossed 1 million production mark on 21 October 2020, just 3 years and 9 months since it started production in February 2017. It is the fastest production site of Suzuki to reach the milestone. It crossed production mark of two million units on 20 August 2022. It has achieved this milestone in 5 years and 6 months after having started production in February 2017 and this is the fastest in any Suzuki production plant. The 2 millionth vehicles produced was a Baleno with South African specifications.

Current production 
 Plant A (February 2017 – present) - Suzuki Baleno  - 250,000 units/year
 Plant B (January 2019 – present) - Suzuki Swift - 250,000 units/year
 Plant C (April 2021 – present) - Suzuki Dzire - 250,000 units/year

 Powertrain plant - K12 petrol engine family - 500,000 units/year, 5MT and AGS transmissions - 500,000 units/year

References 

Suzuki
Manufacturing companies based in Ahmedabad
Car manufacturers of India
Vehicle manufacturing companies established in 2014
Indian subsidiaries of foreign companies
2014 establishments in Gujarat
Indian companies established in 2014